Elole is a village in the rural community of Djibidione CR, located in the arrondissement of Sindian and Bignona Department, a subdivision of the Ziguinchor Region in the historic region of Casamance in the south of the country.
Elole is a landlocked town with 160 people in the town. It is located in Senegal.

Populated places in the Bignona Department
Arrondissement of Sindian

Sources

1. Map Marker